Sauratown Trail is a hiking and bridle trail in Stokes and Surry counties, North Carolina, which crosses the Sauratown Mountains and interconnects Pilot Mountain State Park and Hanging Rock State Park. It is the only bridle trail which goes between two NC State Parks. The trail is located primarily on leased, privately owned lands, and it is the longest publicly open trail on private lands in the state. The trail was dedicated by the Sauratown Trail Committee in October 1979. Since 2002, most of the main trail has been designated a part of the Mountains-to-Sea Trail.

The Sauratown Trails Association was founded in 1988 to succeed the Sauratown Trail Committee, and it created the current trail's route and its spurs.  The volunteer group is primarily responsible for the trail's maintenance and continued existence.

Spur Trails 
 The James Booth Loop is a spur trail which loops around on land owned by James Booth, a Stokes County Commissioner supportive of the trails.
 The Sauratown Loop is a spur trail that loops around the northern slope of Ruben Mountain.

Former Spurs 
 The Wondest Tucker Loop was a spur trail that looped around forested lands near Vade Mecum Creek, and it offered access to a small cave.  The loop was  around, and it was  round trip from the Tory's Den trail head.  The loop was permanently closed in late November 2009.

References

External links 
 Sauratown Trails Association Website
 Sauratown Trails Association Facebook

Hiking trails in North Carolina
Protected areas of Surry County, North Carolina
Protected areas of Stokes County, North Carolina
Long-distance trails in the United States
Horse trails